Eel River Township is the name of two townships in Indiana:

Eel River Township, Allen County, Indiana
Eel River Township, Hendricks County, Indiana

See also 
 Eel River (disambiguation)
 Eel (disambiguation)

Indiana township disambiguation pages